is a Japanese actress.

Selected filmography

Films

Television dramas

Theater

Anime

Dubbing

Honours
Medal with Purple Ribbon (1999)
Order of the Rising Sun, 4th Class, Gold Rays with Rosette (2005)
Kinuyo Tanaka Award (2006)
Japan Academy Film Prize: Distinguished Service Award (2022)

References

External links
Official profile 

1933 births
20th-century Japanese actresses
21st-century Japanese actresses
Living people
People from Yokohama
Recipients of the Medal with Purple Ribbon
Recipients of the Order of the Rising Sun, 4th class